Mariano Tolentino (June 22, 1928 – 1998) was a Filipino basketball player who played for the national team competed in the 1952 Summer Olympics and in the 1956 Summer Olympics.

He was part of the national men's basketball team who won three consecutive Asiad medals and bronze medal in the 1954 World Basketball Championship.

He was inducted into the Philippine Sports Hall of Fame for his achievements in the sport of Basketball on January 25, 2016.

References

External links
 

1928 births
1998 deaths
Basketball players from Cavite
Olympic basketball players of the Philippines
Basketball players at the 1952 Summer Olympics
Basketball players at the 1956 Summer Olympics
Asian Games medalists in basketball
Basketball players at the 1951 Asian Games
Basketball players at the 1954 Asian Games
Basketball players at the 1958 Asian Games
Philippines men's national basketball team players
Filipino men's basketball players
1959 FIBA World Championship players
Asian Games gold medalists for the Philippines
Medalists at the 1951 Asian Games
Medalists at the 1954 Asian Games
Medalists at the 1958 Asian Games
JRU Heavy Bombers basketball players
Philippine Sports Hall of Fame inductees
1954 FIBA World Championship players
Date of death missing
Place of death missing